Robert Francis Jones (May 26, 1934 – December 18, 2002) was a novelist and an outdoor writer for Sports Illustrated and Field & Stream. Many of his novels contain fantastic and/or surrealistic elements, causing some critics to label his work slipstream.  Jones' archive resides at the Albert and Shirley Small Special Collections Library at the University of Virginia.

Born and raised in Milwaukee, Wisconsin, Jones graduated with honors from the University of Michigan in 1956 and then served in the United States Navy as an ensign, with sea duty in the western Pacific. After his military service, he was a reporter for the Milwaukee Sentinel newspaper in 1959 and then went to Time magazine in 1960. Jones transferred to its sister publication Sports Illustrated in 1968, where he covered the outdoors and a variety of sports, including motor sports and pro football.

A Vermont resident in his later years, Jones died at age 68 of natural causes at Southwestern Vermont Medical Center in Bennington in late 2002, survived by his wife of 46 years and two adult children.

Bibliography

Fiction 
 Blood Sport (1974): Novel about a father and son fishing trip up the mythical Hassayampa river, which runs from upstate New York to China, and ancient times, and their encounter with legendary outlaw "Ratnose." 
 The Diamond Bogo (1978): The story of an African hunting expedition for a large cape buffalo with a giant diamond embedded in its horns, and involving the discovery of a surviving lost race colony of homo erectus.
 Slade's Glacier (1981)
 Blood Tide (1990): A nautical adventure tale of a father and daughter setting out to wreak vengeance on two different men who had each betrayed them.
 The Man-Eaters of Zamani (1991): Short story on the hunting of a lion in Zamani region of Somalia (Petersen's Hunting 1991) .
 Tie My Bones To Her Back (AKA The Buffalo Runners) (1996): Western
 Deadville (1999): Western
 The Run to Gitche Gumee

Non-Fiction 
 Gone to the Dogs: Life With My Canine Companions
 Dancers in the Sunset Sky
 The Fishing Doctor: the Essential Tackle Box Companion
 The Hunter In My Heart: A Sportsman's Salmagundi
 African Twilight: The Story of a Hunter
 Upland Passage: A Field Dog's Education
 Jake: A Labrador Puppy at Work and Play

References 

1934 births
2002 deaths
20th-century American novelists
American magazine writers
American male novelists
American sportswriters
20th-century American male writers
20th-century American non-fiction writers
American male non-fiction writers